Anil S Benake is an Indian politician. He was elected to the Karnataka Legislative Assembly. He serves as a MLA in Belgaum since 2018.  He is a member of the Bhartiya Janata Party.

History 
He was born on 13th July 1965 and completed his graduation from RL Law College in 1991.

References 

Karnataka MLAs 2018–2023
21st-century Indian politicians
Living people
1965 births